Marcus Daniell and Artem Sitak were the defending champions, but chose not to participate together. Daniell played alongside Marcelo Demoliner, but lost in the quarterfinals to Bob and Mike Bryan. Sitak teamed up with Nicholas Monroe, but lost in the quarterfinals to Oliver Marach and Mate Pavić.

Jamie Murray and Bruno Soares won the title, defeating Marach and Pavić in the final, 6–7(4–7), 7–5, [10–5].

Seeds

Draw

Draw

References

External links
 Main draw

Stuttgart Open - Doubles
Doubles 2017